Heat shock protein beta-6 (HSPB6) is a protein that in humans is encoded by the HSPB6 gene.

HSPB6 is a 17-kDa member of the heat shock family of proteins. HSPB6 was first identified in 1994 when it was isolated from rat and human skeletal muscle as a complex with HSPB1 (also known as HSP27) and HSPB5 (also known as αB-crystallin).

HSPB6 is expressed in multiple tissues; however, HSPB6 is most highly and constitutively expressed in vascular, airway, colonic, bladder, uterine smooth muscle, cardiac muscle and skeletal muscle. HSPB6 has specific functions for vasodilation, platelet function, and insulin resistance and in smooth and cardiac muscle.

References

Further reading

External links 
 

Heat shock proteins